Malcolm Harding (born 28 May 1959) is a New Zealand cricketer. He played in four first-class matches for Northern Districts in 1986/87.

See also
 List of Northern Districts representative cricketers

References

External links
 

1959 births
Living people
New Zealand cricketers
Northern Districts cricketers
Cricketers from Hamilton, New Zealand